Events from the year 1578 in art.

Events
March 8 - On the death of Elisabeth of Brandenburg-Küstrin, her husband, Margrave George Frederick I of Brandenburg-Ansbach-Kulmbach commissions a monument by Willem van Bloche.

Works

George Gower – Lady Philippa Coningsby
Cornelis Ketel – Portraits
Richard Goodricke of Ribston
Thomas Pead

Births
March 17 – Francesco Albani, Italian painter (died 1660)
August 10 – Matteo Rosselli, Italian painter of historical paintings in the late Florentine and early Baroque (died 1650)
October 12 – Baldassare Aloisi, Italian portrait painter and engraver (died 1638)
date unknown
Jan Baptist Barbé, Flemish engraver (died 1649)
Battistello Caracciolo, Italian painter (died 1635)
Agostino Ciampelli, Italian fresco painter (died 1640)
Adam Elsheimer, German "cabinet" painter (died 1610)
Fede Galizia, Italian still life painter (died 1630)
Ottavio Leoni, Italian painter and printmaker (died 1630)
Francisco Lopez Caro, Spanish painter (died 1662)
Bartolomeo Schedoni, Italian painter (died 1615)
Jean Toutin, French enamel worker, one of the first artists to make enamel portrait miniatures (died 1644)
Alessandro Turchi, Italian painter (died 1649)
Hieronymus Francken II, Flemish painter (d. unknown)
Francesco Stringa, Italian court painter for Duke Ranuccio I Farnese (died 1615)
probable
Guy François, French painter (died 1650)
Iwasa Matabei, Japanese painter (died 1650)
Pieter Neeffs I, Flemish Baroque painter who specialized in architectural interiors of churches (died 1656)
Gerrit van Bloclant, Dutch Renaissance painter (died 1650)

Deaths
January 5 – Giulio Clovio, Croatian illustrator and miniaturist (born 1498)
February 5 – Giovanni Battista Moroni, Italian Mannerist painter (born 1520/1524)
March 17 - Cornelis Cort, Dutch engraver and draughtsman (born 1533)
August 28 - Giovanni Battista Zelotti, Italian painter (born 1526)
October 13 - Jean Bullant, French sculptor and architect (born 1515)
Date unknown
Pierre Lamo, Italian history painter
Bernardino Lanini, Italian Renaissance painter active mainly in Milan (born 1511) (probable date)
Benedetto Pagni, Italian painter
Qian Gu, Chinese landscape painter during the Ming Dynasty (born c.1508) (approximate date)
Raffaellino da Reggio, Italian Mannerist painter (born 1550)

Footnotes

References

 
Years of the 16th century in art